Stade Municipal de Bafoussam is a multi-use stadium in Bafoussam, Cameroon.  It is currently used mostly for football matches and serves as a home ground of Université FC de Ngaoundéré of the Cameroon Première Division. The stadium holds 5,000 spectators.

External links
Stadium information

Football venues in Cameroon